Pablo Sánchez-Valladares García (born 12 November 1997) is a Spanish middle-distance runner. He competed in the 800 metres at the 2020 Summer Olympics, where he was eliminated in round 1, running a time of 1:46.06.

References

External links
 
 
 
 

1997 births
Living people
Spanish male middle-distance runners
Olympic athletes of Spain
Athletes (track and field) at the 2020 Summer Olympics
People from Torrejón de Ardoz
Athletes from the Community of Madrid
21st-century Spanish people